Arthur Stephens Philpotts (1844 – 12 August 1920) was a British naval officer and politician.

Born at Bishopstowe in Torquay, Philpotts was educated at Chudleigh Grammar School, and then the Royal Academy, Gosport.  He joined the Royal Navy in 1858, becoming a lieutenant in 1866, serving with the Abyssinian Relief Force the following year, winning a mention in dispatches.  He became a commander in 1880, and was a divisional officer in the coastguard from 1882 until 1888.  He retired in 1895, gaining appointment as a captain.

In the 1895 UK general election, Philpotts was elected for the Conservative Party in Torquay, serving until his retirement in 1900.

References

1844 births
1920 deaths
Conservative Party (UK) MPs for English constituencies
Members of the Parliament of the United Kingdom for constituencies in Devon
Politicians from Torquay
Royal Navy officers
UK MPs 1895–1900
Military personnel from Torquay